ASC Jeanne d'Arc de Dakar, also known as simply JA, is a Senegalese basketball team based in Dakar. It is part of the ASC Jeanne d'Arc multi-sports club which is most known for its football section. In 1991, the team won the African Clubs Championship and was crowned African champion.

The most famous player of the club has been Mathieu Faye, who has been enshrined into the FIBA Basketball Hall of Fame.

Honours
African Clubs Championship
Champions (1): 1991
Runners-up: 1992
Nationale 1
Champions (7): 1986, 1987, 1990, 1992, 1996, 1997, 2002
Saint Michel Cup

 Winners (13): 2003, 2022

Season by season

References

External links
Jeanne D'Arc Dakar on Afrobasket.com

Basketball teams in Senegal
Sport in Dakar
Basketball teams established in 1923